Bartonella talpae, formerly belonging to the Grahamella genus, is a bacterium. As with other Bartonella species, it can cause disease in animals.

References

External links
Bartonella-Associated Infections – CDC
Bartonella species - List of Prokaryotic names with Standing in Nomenclature
Bartonella talpae on Culture Collection, University of Göteborg, Sweden

Bartonellaceae
Bacteria described in 1995